Any Other Business was a radio program that aired from May 1995 to July 1995.  There were six 35-minute episodes and it was broadcast on BBC Radio 4.  It starred John Duttine, Jan Ravens, June Whitfield, James Grout, and Toby Longworth.  It was written by Lucy Flannery and produced by Liz Ansty.

References 
 Lavalie, John. Any Other Business. EpGuides. 21 Jul 2005. 29 Jul 2005  <https://web.archive.org/web/20070814083806/http://www.epguides.com/AnyOtherBusiness/>.

BBC Radio 4 programmes
1995 radio programme debuts